Sangamner Assembly constituency is one of the 288 Vidhan Sabha (Legislative Assembly) constituencies of Maharashtra state in Western India.

Overview
Sangamner (constituency number 217) is one of the twelve Vidhan Sabha constituencies located in the Ahmednagar district. It comprises part of Rahata tehsil and the entire Sangamner tehsil of the district.

Sangamner is part of the Shirdi Lok Sabha constituency along with five other Vidhan Sabha segments in this district, namely Akole, Shirdi, Kopargaon, Shrirampur and Nevasa.

Members of Legislative Assembly

Election Results

General election 2014

General election 2019

 

Maharashtra Pradesh Congress Committee President, Balasaheb Thorat won this seat for the 8th consecutive term.

See also
 Sangamner
 List of constituencies of Maharashtra Vidhan Sabha

References

Assembly constituencies of Maharashtra
1962 establishments in Maharashtra
Constituencies established in 1962